Mohammad-Javad Vahaji is an Iranian economist who served as the deputy governor of the Central Bank of Iran for years.
Vahaji was the bank's acting governor in 2003.

References

Iranian economists
Governors of the Central Bank of Iran
Year of birth missing (living people)
Living people